William Duchman (October 8, 1809 – November 14, 1881) was an American businessman and politician.

Born in Lancaster County, Pennsylvania, Duchman served as register of deeds of Lancaster County and was an aide on the staff of the Governor of Pennsylvania William F. Johnston. In 1849, Duchman moved to Milwaukee, Wisconsin, and, in 1850, to Menasha, Wisconsin. He was a lumber sawmill operator and manufacturer of paper. In 1858, Duchman served in the Wisconsin State Assembly and was a Republican. He died in Menasha.

Notes

1809 births
1881 deaths
People from Lancaster County, Pennsylvania
People from Menasha, Wisconsin
Businesspeople from Wisconsin
County officials in Pennsylvania
Republican Party members of the Wisconsin State Assembly
19th-century American politicians
19th-century American businesspeople